The Punthamara were an indigenous Australian people of the state of Queensland.

Country
They were also present at Tobermorey, on the border with the present-day Northern Territory. Running north from Orient and Thargomindah, their lands approached the vicinity of Quilpie.

History of contact
Punthamara lands and those of many other neighbouring tribes were pegged out and squatted by Patrick Durack, who took on several members of the tribe to serve him.

Ethnography
The early ethnographer R. H. Mathews argued that the Punthamara were just one tribal group in a larger entity, which he called Wonkamurra Nation, consisting also of the Wongkumara, Kalali, Yandruwandha and Yauraworka. The notion of such artificial supratribal "nations" has been viewed skeptically by Tindale.

Social organization and customs

The Punthamara used circumcision in their initiatory rites, but refrained by subincision.

Alternative names
 Bunthomarra
 Buntamara
 Buntamurra
 Banthamurra
 Buntha-burra
 Boonthamurra
 Boontha Murra

Some words
 kuraba. (pigweed variety of purslane).

Notes

Citations

Sources

Aboriginal peoples of Queensland